Bluff City is the second studio album by the Compulsive Gamblers. It was released on April 27, 1999, by the independent music label, Sympathy for the Record Industry. The album was recorded after the band returned from a four-year hiatus in which members Greg Cartwright and Jack Yarber were recording under the name, the Oblivians. Bluff City was written while the Compulsive Gamblers were a threesome, with Cartwright and Yarber joined by Bushrod Thomas on drums. After the recording of Bluff City, the group recruited bassist Jeff Meier for a European tour in support of the album.

Track listing
 "My Love Is a Monster" (Cartwright, Sayles) - 3:25 
 "X-Ray Eyes" (Cartwright, Yarber) - 3:07 
 "Mystery Girl" (Cartwright) - 3:38 
 "Pepper Spray Boogie" (Yarber) - 2:36 
 "I Call You Mine" (Cartwright) - 4:16 
 "One-Eyed Girl" (Cartwright) - 4:43 
 "I Don't Want to Laugh at You" (Cartwright) - 4:40 
 "New Romance" (Cartwright) - 2:57 
 "You Don't Want Me" - 4:35 
 "Don't Come Looking for Me Now" (Cartwright) - 3:48 
 "Trouble" (Majors) - 3:47 
 "Don't Haunt Me" (Traditional) - 4:08

Personnel
 Greg Cartwright - organ, guitar, bass, vocals
 Jack Yarber - organ, bass, saxophone, vocals, guitar
 Dale Beavers - guitar
 Scott Bomar - bass, piano

References

1999 albums
Compulsive Gamblers albums
Sympathy for the Record Industry albums